Tae Hyun Bang (born April 15, 1983) is a South Korean mixed martial artist who most recently competed in the Lightweight division of the Ultimate Fighting Championship. A professional competitor since 2004, he has also competed for World Victory Road and DEEP in Japan. He is the former DEEP Lightweight Champion.

Mixed martial arts career

Ultimate Fighting Championship
Bang made his promotional debut against Mairbek Taisumov on January 4, 2014, at UFC Fight Night 34. He lost the fight via unanimous decision.

Bang faced Kajan Johnson on June 14, 2014, at UFC 174. Bang won the fight via knockout and won both Fight of the Night and Performance of the Night bonuses.

Bang next faced Jon Tuck on May 16, 2015, at UFC Fight Night 66. Bang lost the fight via submission in the first round.

Bang faced Leo Kuntz on November 28, 2015, at UFC Fight Night 79. He won the fight via split decision.

Bang next faced Nick Hein on September 3, 2016, at UFC Fight Night 93. He lost the fight via unanimous decision.

Bang was released from the UFC in October 2017.

Fight fixing
On November 24, 2017, at the Seoul Central District Court in South Korea, Tae Hyun Bang was sentenced to 10 months in prison, along with the three "brokers" who set up the plot, for accepting bribes in connection to throw his fight against Leo Kuntz at UFC Fight Night 79 for US$92,160, where he bet half of the prize money on Kuntz. UFC officials warned both fighters of potential fight fixing when they noticed a big odd shift in the betting lines leading into the event.

Championships and accomplishments
DEEP
DEEP Lightweight Championship (One time)
Ultimate Fighting Championship
Fight of the Night (One time)
Performance of the Night (One time)

Mixed martial arts record

|-
|Loss
|align=center|18–10
|Nick Hein
|Decision (unanimous)
|UFC Fight Night: Arlovski vs. Barnett
|
|align=center|3
|align=center|5:00
|Hamburg, Germany
| 
|-
|Win
|align=center|18–9
|Leo Kuntz
|Decision (split)
|UFC Fight Night: Henderson vs. Masvidal
|
|align=center|3
|align=center|5:00
|Seoul, South Korea
| 
|-
| Loss
| align=center| 17–9
| Jon Tuck
| Submission (rear-naked choke)
| UFC Fight Night: Edgar vs. Faber
| 
| align=center| 1
| align=center| 3:56
| Pasay, Philippines
| 
|-
| Win
| align=center| 17–8
| Kajan Johnson
| KO (punch)
| UFC 174
| 
| align=center| 3
| align=center| 2:01
| Vancouver, Canada
| Performance of the Night. Fight of the Night.
|-
| Loss
| align=center| 16–8
| Mairbek Taisumov
| Decision (unanimous)
| UFC Fight Night: Saffiedine vs. Lim
| 
| align=center| 3
| align=center| 5:00
| Marina Bay, Singapore
| 
|-
| Win
| align=center| 16–7
| Joo Dong Hwang
| TKO (punches)
| Top FC: Original
| 
| align=center| 2
| align=center| 0:00
| Seoul, South Korea
| 
|-
| Loss
| align=center| 15–7
| Daisuke Hanazawa
| Submission (rear-naked choke)
| Road FC 1: The Resurrection of Champions
| 
| align=center| 1
| align=center| 2:54
| Seoul, South Korea
| 
|-
| Win
| align=center| 15–6
| Cameron Silva
| TKO (punches)
| M-1 Selection 2010: Asia Finals
| 
| align=center| 1
| align=center| 3:02
| Tokyo, Japan
| 
|-
| Loss
| align=center| 14–6
| Jorge Masvidal
| Decision (unanimous)
| World Victory Road Presents: Sengoku 6
| 
| align=center| 3
| align=center| 5:00
| Saitama, Japan
| 
|-
| Loss
| align=center| 14–5
| Takanori Gomi
| Decision (unanimous)
| World Victory Road Presents: Sengoku 4
| 
| align=center| 3
| align=center| 5:00
| Saitama, Japan
| 
|-
| Win
| align=center| 14–4
| Kazunori Yokota
| KO (punches)
| DEEP 35: Impact
| 
| align=center| 1
| align=center| 3:38
| Tokyo, Japan
| Won the DEEP Lightweight Championship.
|-
| Win
| align=center| 13–4
| Luiz Andrade I
| Decision (unanimous)
| DEEP: clubDEEP Tokyo
| 
| align=center| 2
| align=center| 5:00
| Tokyo, Japan
| 
|-
| Win
| align=center| 12–4
| Jutaro Nakao
| TKO (punches)
| DEEP 33: Impact
| 
| align=center| 2
| align=center| 1:15
| Tokyo, Japan
|Catchweight (76 kg) bout.
|-
| Win
| align=center| 11–4
| Yoshihiro Tomioka
| Decision (unanimous)
| DEEP 32: Impact
| 
| align=center| 2
| align=center| 5:00
| Tokyo, Japan
| 
|-
| Win
| align=center| 10–4
| Naoki Matsushita
| Decision (unanimous)
| DEEP: CMA Festival 2
| 
| align=center| 2
| align=center| 5:00
| Tokyo, Japan
| 
|-
| Loss
| align=center| 9–4
| Seichi Ikemoto
| Decision (unanimous)
| DEEP 30: Impact
| 
| align=center| 3
| align=center| 5:00
| Osaka, Japan
|Welterweight bout.
|-
| Loss
| align=center| 9–3
| Jong Man Kim
| Decision (unanimous)
| NF: Neo Fight 11
| 
| align=center| 2
| align=center| 5:00
| Seoul, South Korea
| 
|-
| Win
| align=center| 9–2
| Malik Marai
| Decision (unanimous)
| NF: Neo Fight 11
| 
| align=center| 2
| align=center| 5:00
| Seoul, South Korea
| 
|-
| Win
| align=center| 8–2
| Soon Myung Yoon
| Decision (unanimous)
| NF: Neo Fight 8
| 
| align=center| 3
| align=center| 5:00
| Busan, South Korea
| 
|-
| Win
| align=center| 7–2
| Kyung Yang
| KO (flying knee)
| NF: Neo Fight 6, Day 2
| 
| align=center| 2
| align=center| 0:34
| North Chungcheong, South Korea
| 
|-
| Win
| align=center| 6–2
| Jang Hoon Sung
| Decision (unanimous)
| NF: Neo Fight 6, Day 2
| 
| align=center| 3
| align=center| 5:00
| North Chungcheong, South Korea
|Lightweight debut.
|-
| Win
| align=center| 5–2
| Luis Charneski
| TKO (punches)
| G5: Gimme Five
| 
| align=center| 1
| align=center| 2:32
| Seoul, South Korea
| 
|-
| Loss
| align=center| 4–2
| Jeong Ho Lee
| Submission (armbar)
| G5: Yungjin Pharm Middleweight Tournament Quarterfinals
| 
| align=center| 1
| align=center| 1:42
| Seoul, South Korea
| 
|-
| Win
| align=center| 4–1
| Hae Won Kim
| Decision (unanimous)
| G5: Yungjin Pharm Middleweight Tournament Second Round
| 
| align=center| 3
| align=center| 5:00
| Seoul, South Korea
| 
|-
| Win
| align=center| 3–1
| Sung Chu Kim
| KO (punches)
| G5: Yungjin Pharm Middleweight Tournament Opening Round
| 
| align=center| 1
| align=center| 0:47
| Seoul, South Korea
| 
|-
| Win
| align=center| 2–1
| Kwang Sik Min
| TKO (doctor stoppage)
| G5: Gimme Five
| 
| align=center| 2
| align=center| 1:25
| Seoul, South Korea
| 
|-
| Loss
| align=center| 1–1
| Myung Kyo Jung
| Decision (unanimous)
| G5: Motorola Middleweight Tournament Opening Round
| 
| align=center| 3
| align=center| 5:00
| Seoul, South Korea
| 
|-
| Win
| align=center| 1–0
| Chang Min Oh
| Decision (unanimous)
| G5: Gimme Five
| 
| align=center| 3
| align=center| 5:00
| Seoul, South Korea
|

See also

List of male mixed martial artists

References

External links
 
 

1983 births
South Korean male mixed martial artists
Lightweight mixed martial artists
Welterweight mixed martial artists
Living people
Deep (mixed martial arts) champions
Ultimate Fighting Championship male fighters